Events in the year 1990 in Mexico.

Incumbents

Federal government
 President: Carlos Salinas de Gortari
 Interior Secretary (SEGOB): Fernando Gutiérrez Barrios
 Secretary of Foreign Affairs (SRE): Fernando Solana
 Communications Secretary (SCT): Andrés Caso Lombardo
 Education Secretary (SEP): Manuel Bartlett
 Secretary of Defense (SEDENA): Antonio Riviello Bazán
 Secretary of Navy: Luis Carlos Ruano Angulo
 Secretary of Labor and Social Welfare: Arsenio Farell Cubillas
 Secretary of Welfare: Patricio Chirinos Calero
 Secretary of Public Education: Manuel Bartlett Díaz
 Tourism Secretary (SECTUR): Carlos Hank González (until 4 January), Pedro Joaquín Coldwell (starting 5 January)
 Secretary of the Environment (SEMARNAT): María de los Angeles Moreno
 Secretary of Health (SALUD): Jesús Kumate Rodríguez

Supreme Court

 President of the Supreme Court: Carlos del Río Rodríguez

Governors

 Aguascalientes: Miguel Ángel Barberena Vega, (Institutional Revolutionary Party, PRI)
 Baja California: Ernesto Ruffo Appel, (National Action Party PAN)
 Baja California Sur: Abelardo Carrillo Zavala
 Campeche: Víctor Manuel Liceaga Ruibal/Abelardo Carrillo Zavala
 Chiapas: Patrocinio González Garrido
 Chihuahua: Fernando Baeza Meléndez
 Coahuila: Eliseo Mendoza Berrueto
 Colima: Elías Zamora Verduzco/Carlos de la Madrid Virgen
 Durango: Armando del Castillo Franco/José Ramírez Gamero
 Guanajuato: Rafael Corrales Ayala/Carlos Medina Plascencia
 Guerrero: Alejandro Cervantes Delgado
 Hidalgo: Adolfo Lugo Verduzco
 Jalisco: Guillermo Cosío Vidaurri
 State of Mexico: Guillermo Cosío Vidaurri 
 Michoacán: Genovevo Figueroa Zamudio
 Morelos: Antonio Riva Palacio (PRI).
 Nayarit: Celso Humberto Delgado Ramírez
 Nuevo León: Jorge Treviño
 Oaxaca: Heladio Ramírez López
 Puebla: Mariano Piña Olaya
 Querétaro: Mariano Palacios Alcocer
 Quintana Roo: Miguel Borge Martín
 San Luis Potosí: no data
 Sinaloa: Francisco Labastida
 Sonora: Rodolfo Félix Valdés
 Tabasco: Salvador Neme Castillo
 Tamaulipas: Américo Villarreal Guerra	
 Tlaxcala: Beatriz Paredes Rangel
 Veracruz: Dante Delgado Rannauro
 Yucatán: Víctor Manzanilla Schaffer
 Zacatecas: Genaro Borrego Estrada
Regent of Mexico City: Manuel Camacho Solís

Events

 Fobaproa is created to attempt to resolve liquidity problems of the banking system. 
 May 20: The Federal Electoral Tribunal is created as a guarantor of the constitutionality of the electoral process. 
 August 4–9: Hurricane Diana 
 September 29 : Miss Mexico 1990 held in Boca del Rio, Veracruz.  
 December 8: The Labor Party is founded.

Awards
Belisario Domínguez Medal of Honor – Andrés Serra Rojas

Sport

 1989–90 Mexican Primera División season
 1989–90 Copa Mexico 
 Bravos de León win the Mexican League.
 1990 Central American and Caribbean Games held in Mexico City. 
 1990 Mexican Grand Prix
 1990 480 km of Mexico City 
 1990 World Karate Championships held in Mexico City.
 1990 Pan American Race Walking Cup in Xalapa, Veracruz.

Births

 July 9 – Nataly Michel, fencer

References

 
Mexico